Saint-Jean-de-la-Porte is a commune in the Savoie department in the Auvergne-Rhône-Alpes region of Southeastern France. In 2017, it had a population of 937.

See also
Communes of the Savoie department

References

External links

Official site

Communes of Savoie